Mark Schwartz may refer to:
 Mark Schwartz (soccer), American soccer forward
 Mark C. Schwartz, United States Army general 
 Mark D. Schwartz, American attorney